Whitley is a surname. Notable people with the surname include:

Alice Whitley (1913–1990), Australian chemist and educator
Benton Whitley (born 1999), American football player
Charles Orville Whitley (1927–2002), Democratic U.S. Congressman from North Carolina
Chris Whitley (1960–2005), American singer, songwriter and guitarist
E. J. Whitley (born 1982), American football player 
Edward Whitley (environmentalist), British financial advisor and philanthropist, 
Edward Whitley (politician) (1825–1892), English solicitor and Conservative Member of Parliament
Forrest Whitley (born 1997), American baseball player
Gilbert Percy Whitley (1903–1975), British-born Australian ichthyologist
Henry Charles Whitley CVO (1906–1976), Church of Scotland minister and author
Herbert Whitley (died 1955), British millionaire and animal breeder who established Paignton Zoo
Hobart Johnstone Whitley (1847–1931), American land developer
James Whitley (disambiguation), several people
Jeff Whitley (born 1979), Zambian-born Northern Irish professional football player
Jim Whitley (born 1975), Zambian-born Northern Irish professional footballer
John Whitley (disambiguation), several people
June Whitley, Canadian actress
Keith Whitley (1955–1989), American country music singer
Kevin Whitley (born 1970), American football coach
Kodi Whitley (born 1995), American baseball player
Kym Whitley (born 1961), American actress and comedian
Marissa Whitley, Miss Teen USA 2001, representing the state of Missouri
Norman Whitley (1890–1982), British Army officer, judge and Olympic silver medalist in lacrosse
Ray Whitley (singer-songwriter) (1901–1979), American Country and Western singer, radio and Hollywood movie star
Ray Whitley (songwriter) (1943–2013), American beach music composer and singer-songwriter
Richard Whitley (born 1948) American screenwriter and producer
Taylor Whitley (1980–2018), offensive guard in the National Football League
William Whitley (1749–1813), early American pioneer